Dawson Community Airport  is five miles northwest of Glendive, in Dawson County, Montana, United States. The airport has one airline, subsidized by the Essential Air Service program.

The airport opened around 1970, replacing the airport on the east side of the river just north of I-94. Northwest Airlines served Glendive from about 1933 until 1936 as one of multiple stops on a route between Seattle and Chicago. Frontier Airlines started flights to the old airport in 1954; its Twin Otters pulled out of the new airport in 1980.

The Federal Aviation Administration says this airport had 211 passenger boardings (enplanements) in calendar year 2008, 243 in 2009 and 427 in 2010. The National Plan of Integrated Airport Systems for 2011–2015 categorized it as a general aviation airport (the commercial service category requires at least 2,500 enplanements per year).

Scheduled air service temporarily ceased on March 8, 2008, when Big Sky Airlines ended operations in bankruptcy. Great Lakes Airlines was given USDOT approval to take over Essential Air Service (EAS) and flights began in 2009.  Service is currently provided under EAS contract by Cape Air.

Facilities
Dawson Community Airport covers 413 acres (167 ha) at an elevation of 2,458 feet (749 m). It has two asphalt runways: 12/30 is 5,704 by 100 feet (1,739 x 30 m) and 2/20 is 3,002 by 60 feet (915 x 18 m).

In the year ending December 30, 2009, the airport had 5,815 aircraft operations, averaging 15 per day: 55% general aviation, 45% air taxi, and <1% military. 17 aircraft were then based at the airport, all single-engine.

Airline and destination

Statistics

References

Other sources

 Essential Air Service documents (Docket DOT-OST-1997-2605) from the U.S. Department of Transportation:
 Order 2005-12-20 (December 30, 2005): selecting Big Sky Transportation Co., d/b/a Big Sky Airlines, to continue providing essential air service at seven Montana communities (Glasgow, Glendive, Havre, Lewistown, Miles City, Sidney, and Wolf Point) for a new two-year period beginning March 1, 2006, at a subsidy of $6,838,934 annually.
 Order 2007-11-21 (November 26, 2007): selecting Big Sky Transportation Co., d/b/a Big Sky Airlines, to continue providing essential air service at seven Montana communities for a new two-year period beginning March 1, 2008, at a subsidy of $8,473,617 annually.
 Order 2007-12-22 (December 21, 2007): allowing Big Sky Transportation Co., d/b/a Big Sky Airlines, to suspend its subsidized essential air services at seven Montana communities on the date that Great Lakes Aviation, Ltd., begins replacement service, and selecting Great Lakes to provide those services at subsidy rates totaling $8,201,992.
 Order 2011-1-27 (February 2, 2011): selecting Gulfstream International Airlines, to provide subsidized essential air service (EAS) with 19-passenger Beechcraft B-1900D aircraft at Glasgow, Glendive, Havre, Lewistown, Miles City, Sidney, and Wolf Point, Montana, for a two-year period beginning when the carrier inaugurates full EAS at all seven communities through the end of the 24th month thereafter (two-year period ended May 31, 2013), at a combined annual subsidy rate of $10,903,854. Aircraft: 19-passenger Beech 1900-D. Destination: Billings. The subsidy and level of service for each community is as follows: Lewistown $1,325,733 (12 nonstop round trips each week), Miles City: $1,621,821 (12 nonstop round trips each week), Sidney $2,932,152 (17 nonstop round trips each week), Havre $1,162,329 (12 one-stop round trips each week), Glendive $1,193,391 (12 one-stop round trips each week), Glasgow $1,166,049 (5 nonstop and 7 one-stop round trips each week), Wolf Point $1,502,378 (7 nonstop and 5 one-stop round trips each week).
 Notice (June 28, 2013): from Silver Airways of its intent to discontinue scheduled subsidized Essential Air Service between Glasgow, Glendive, Havre, Lewistown, Miles City, Sidney, Wolf Point, Montana and Billings, Montana. Commensurate with the end of subsidy eligibility, Silver Airways will end service to Lewistown and Miles City on July 15, 2013. Further, Silver Airways hereby serves 90-day notice of its intent to discontinue service to the communities of Glasgow, Glendive, Havre, Sidney and Wolf Point, Montana effective September 27, 2013.
 Order 2013-6-3 (June 4, 2013): extending the contract established under Order 2011-1-27, issued on February 3, 2011, for Silver Airways, Inc. (formerly Gulfstream International Airlines), to provide Essential Air Service (EAS) operations at Lewistown, Miles City, Glasgow, Glendive, Havre, Sidney, and Wolf Point, Montana, from June 1, 2013, until further notice.
 Order 2013-9-4 (September 5, 2013): selecting Hyannis Air Service, Inc., d/b/a Cape Air, to provide Essential Air Service (EAS) with 9-passenger Cessna 402 aircraft at Glasgow, Glendive, Havre, Sidney, and Wolf Point, Montana, for a two-year period beginning December 1, 2013, through November 30, 2015, at a combined annual subsidy of $11,950,426. The subsidy and level of service for each community is as follows: Glasgow $2,046,800 (2 trips per day), Glendive $1,944,467 (2 trips per day), Havre $2,036,254 (2 trips per day), Sidney $3,777,579 (5 trips per day), Wolf Point $2,145,326 (2 trips per day). Scheduled service: to Billings. Aircraft Type: Cessna 402 (9 passenger seats).
 Order 2013-12-1 (December 2, 2013): Cape Air will commence full EAS at all five of the above communities beginning December 10, 2013, thereby establishing an end date for this contract of December 31, 2015.

External links 
 Dawson Community Airport
 

Airports in Montana
Buildings and structures in Dawson County, Montana
Essential Air Service
Transportation in Dawson County, Montana